David McKay or MacKay may refer to:

Arts 
 Dave Mackay (musician) (born 1932), jazz pianist, singer and composer
 David Mackay (producer) (born 1944), Australian record producer/arranger and musical director
 David McKay (activist) (born 1986), activist and artist known for his betrayal by Brandon Darby and subsequent incarceration
 David McKay (actor), Scottish actor known for the television show Shoebox Zoo
 David McKay (publisher) (1860–1918), comic and book publisher
 David McKay Publications

Sports 
 Dave Mackay (1934–2015), Scottish football player (Hearts, Tottenham, Derby, Scotland) and manager
 Dave Mackay (footballer, born 1981), Scottish football player (Dundee, St Johnstone) and manager
 David Mackay (sailor) (born 1959), New Zealand Olympic sailor
 Dave MacKay (ice hockey) (1919–1980), Canadian professional ice hockey player
 Dave McKay (baseball) (David Lawrence McKay, born 1950), Canadian major league baseball player
 Dave McKay (footballer) (born 1984), Scottish footballer playing for Clyde F.C.
 David Mackay (footballer) (born 1988), Australian rules footballer for Adelaide Crows
 David McKay (baseball) (born 1995), American baseball pitcher for the Oakland Athletics
 David McKay (Australian footballer) (born 1949), Australian rules footballer for Carlton Football Club
 David McKay (footballer, born 1998), Scottish footballer 
 David McKay (journalist) (1921–2004), Australian motoring journalist and racing driver
 David McKay (wrestler) (born 1960), Canadian Olympic wrestler

Others 
 David McKay (politician) (1844-1917), Utah State Senator
 David J. C. MacKay (1967–2016), British academic researcher in information theory and environmentalism, inventor, government advisor and educator
 David Lawrence McKay (1901–1993), leader in the Sunday School of The Church of Jesus Christ of Latter-day Saints
 David Mackay (pilot) (born 1957), Scottish chief pilot of Virgin Galactic
 David MacKay (VC) (1831–1880), Scottish soldier and winner of the Victoria Cross
 David O. McKay (1873–1970), ninth president of The Church of Jesus Christ of Latter-day Saints
 David S. McKay (1936–2013), Chief Scientist for astrobiology at the Johnson Space Center
 David Mackay (architect) (1933–2014), British architect
 David I. McKay, president and CEO of the Royal Bank of Canada 
 A. D. David Mackay, CEO and president of Kellogg Company